Catherine Fonck (born 22 September 1968) is a nephrologist and Belgian politician. She is currently a member of the Centre démocrate humaniste (cdH).

Early life and education 
Fonck was born in Ciney, in the Province of Namur, in the Wallonia region of Belgium.

She graduated from the Catholic University of Louvain in 1993 with a medical degree.

Career
Specialized in internal medicine and nephrology, she worked first at the Cliniques Universitaires Saint-Luc in Brussels and at the St. Elizabeth Maternity and Clinic in Namur.

Fonck married Jacques Doyen. She served as the Minister for Children, Youth Assistance and Health in the French Community of Belgium from 2004 to 2009 and Secretary of State for Environment and Secretary of State for Institutional Reforms in the federal caretaker government in 2014. She is currently the cdH group leader in the Chamber of Representatives since 13 October 2014.

Political career 
Elected member of Parliament since June 2003, she was effective member of the Committee on Public Health, Environment and Renewal of Society as well as alternate member of the Economic Committee and Social Affairs Committee.

From July 2004 to July 2009, she served as the Minister for Children, Youth Assistance and Health in the French Community. During the federal elections of 10 June 2007, Catherine Fonck's list of the CdH in the House for the Province of Hainaut received 25,685 votes.

She was elected member of Parliament but leaves her seat to her substitute deputy to remain Minister for Children, Youth Assistance and Health in French Community. In June 2009, she topped the list CdH in the regional elections in the district of Mons with a total of 7,986 votes. Catherine Fonck is also the current head of the CdH group in federal parliament. She replaces on 22 July 2014 Melchior Wathelet as Secretary of State for Minister of Energy until 13 October 2014.

References 

Living people
1968 births
21st-century Belgian politicians
21st-century Belgian women politicians
Belgian women physicians
Belgian nephrologists